Wiesel may refer to:

People
Elie Wiesel (1928–2016), Romanian-born American novelist, Nobel Peace Prize laureate, philosopher, humanitarian, and Holocaust survivor
Elisha Wiesel (born 1972), American businessman; chief information officer of Goldman Sachs; son of Elie Wiesel
Emíl Wíesel (1866–1943), Russian-German painter and arts curator
Oscar Wiesel (1864–1918), Russian-German diplomat, Norway researcher, founder of Saami collection of Russian Museum of Ethnography (Saint-Petersburg)
Torsten Wiesel (born 1924), Swedish medical researcher, Nobel Prize in Medicine co-laureate, campaigner for human rights

Transportation
IWL SR 56 Wiesel, an East German 1950s motor scooter
Wiesel AWC, a German armored fighting vehicle

Other
Wiesel, Netherlands is a settlement in the Gelderland province in the Netherlands